LINGO is a mathematical modeling language designed for formulating and solving optimization problems, including linear, integer, and nonlinear programming problems.

References

Mathematical modeling
Programming languages